Adem corresponding to Adam (see also Adam in Islam), is a masculine given name common in Turkey and Bosnia.

Given name
Adem Alkaşi (born 1984), Turkish footballer
Adem Asil (born 1999), Turkish gymnast
Adem Bereket (born 1973), Turkish wrestler
Adem Bona (born 2003), Nigerian-Turkish basketball player
Adem Boudjemline (born 1994), Algerian Greco-Roman wrestler
Adem Büyük (born 1987), Turkish footballer
Adem Čejvan (1927–1989), Bosnian actor
Adem Demaçi (1936–2018), Kosovar Albanian writer and politician
Adem Doğan (born 2001), Turkish footballer
Adem Dursun (born 1979), Turkish footballer
Adem Grabovci (born 1960), Kosovan politician
Adem Güven (born 1985), Norwegian footballer
Adem Hecini (born 1975), Algerian athlete
Adem Hodža (born 1968), Kosovan politician
Adem Huskić (born 1955), Bosnian politician
Adem İbrahimoğlu (born 1957), Turkish footballer
Adem Ilhan (born 1977), English composer, producer and singer-songwriter
Adem Jashari (1955–1998), Kosovar Albanian soldier
Adem Kapič (born 1975), Slovenian footballer
Adem Karapici (born 1912), Albanian footballer and coach
Adem K (born 1975), Australian musician
Adem Kılıççı (born 1986), Turkish boxer
Adem Kurt, Turkish musician
Adem Koçak (born 1983), Turkish footballer
Adem Ljajić (born 1991), Serbian footballer
Adem Mekić (born 1995), Macedonian basketball player
Adem Agha Mešić (1868–1945), Bosnian politician and military officer
Adem Mikullovci (1937–2020), Albanian actor and politician
Adem Ören (born 1979), Turkish basketball player
Adem Poric (born 1973), Australian footballer
Adem Redjehimi (born 1995), Algerian footballer
Adem Sarı (born 1985), Turkish footballer
Adem Somyurek (born 1968), Australian politician
Adem Tumerkan (born 1991), American-Turkish writer
Adem Uzun (born 2001), Turkish wrestler
Adem Yze (born 1977), Australian Rules footballer
Adem Zaplluzha (1943–2020), Kosovar Albanian poet
Adem Zorgane (born 2000), Algerian footballer

Surname
Alberto Bustani Adem (born 1954), Mexican engineer
Alejandro Adem, Mexican mathematician
Ali Adem (born 2000), Macedonian footballer
José Adem (1921–1991), Mexican mathematician
Khalid Adem (born 1975), American convict
Sonay Adem (1957–2018), Turkish Cypriot politician
Yashaw Adem (died 2014), Turkish actor

Fictional characters
Adem, main character in 50M2, a 2021 Netflix thriller series
Adem, main character in Leyla Everlasting, a 2020 Netflix film
Adem, leading character in İstanbullu Gelin, a 2017 Turkish television series
Adem, main character in 2011 Turkish film And Then What?

Arabic masculine given names
Bosniak masculine given names
Bosnian masculine given names
Turkish-language surnames
Turkish masculine given names

See also
Adam (given name)

hu:Adem
tr:Adem (isim)